Strathdickie is a rural locality in the Whitsunday Region, Queensland, Australia. In the  Strathdickie had a population of 880 people.

History 
Strathdickie Provisonal School opened on 25 June 1906. On 1 January 1909 it became Strathdicke State School. It closed on 1 June 1962.

In the  Strathdickie had a population of 880 people.

References 

Whitsunday Region
Localities in Queensland